Stefan Söder (born 11 February 1990 in Stockholm, Sweden) is a professional Swedish ice hockey player. He is currently a forward for Djurgårdens IF in Hockeyallsvenskan.

Career statistics

References

External links

1990 births
Djurgårdens IF Hockey players
Swedish ice hockey forwards
Living people
Ice hockey people from Stockholm